Ghiasabad (Romanized as Ghīās̄ābād and Ghīyāsābād; also known as Qīāsābād and Qīyās̄ābād) is a village in Rahmat Rural District, Seyyedan District, Marvdasht County, Fars Province, Iran. At the 2006 census, its population was 90, in 22 families.

References 

Populated places in Marvdasht County